George Loyall (May 29, 1789 – February 24, 1868) was a U.S. Representative from Virginia.

Biography
Born in Norfolk, Virginia, Loyall was graduated from the College of William and Mary, Williamsburg, Virginia, in 1808.
He studied law but did not practice.
Visited England in 1815.
He served as member of the State house of delegates 1818-1827.
He served as delegate to the State constitutional convention in 1829.
He successfully contested the election of Thomas Newton to the Twenty-first Congress and served from March 9, 1830, to March 3, 1831.

Loyall was elected as a Jacksonian to the Twenty-third and Twenty-fourth Congresses (March 4, 1833 – March 3, 1837).
Navy agent at Norfolk, Virginia from 1837 to 1861, with the exception of two years.
He died in Norfolk, Virginia, February 24, 1868.
He was interred in Elmwood Cemetery.

Electoral history
1829; Loyall lost the election to  Republican Thomas Newton but the election was invalidated and Loyall was seated.
1831; Loyall lost his re-election bid to Newton, winning only 48.99% of the vote.
1833; Loyall won re-election with 53.03% of the vote, defeating Miles King Jr.
1835; Loyall won re-election with 52.49% of the vote, defeating Whig Arthur Emmerson.

Sources

1789 births
1868 deaths
Democratic Party members of the Virginia House of Delegates
Jacksonian members of the United States House of Representatives from Virginia
Democratic Party members of the United States House of Representatives from Virginia
19th-century American politicians